St. Andrew's School (founded in 1893) is a nondenominational boarding and day school located on a  campus in Barrington, Rhode Island, serving co-educational grades 6-12 and postgraduate (PG).

History 

St. Andrew's was founded in 1893 by the Reverend William Merrick Chapin, the rector of St. John's Episcopal Church in Barrington, Rhode Island. Father Chapin founded several churches and two schools.

History 
The School was incorporated in 1893 as St. Andrew's manual labor college. For the first 72 years of its existence, St. Andrew's was an orphanage, school, social service agency, and working farm under the auspices of the Episcopal Church. Father Chapin, however, never intended for the School to be Episcopal-only: he believed that St. Andrew's should serve any student who needed it, regardless of race or religious background. This thinking continues today.

In 1950, the trustees modified the original charter, removing the word “industrial” from the School's name and the Statement of Purpose was revised to read that “said corporation is constituted for the purpose of establishing a school and home primarily for the training of boys from families with limited means, or with domestic insecurity.”

By the 1960s, farming had become uncertain as a potential career and outright purchase of food and other goods a more economical way of meeting the School's needs - so the farming program was phased out. In 1964, St. Andrew's was granted membership in the New England Association of Schools and Colleges (NEASC). In 1976, under Headmaster Stephen G. Waters, the Board instituted a long-range plan that led to a significant evolution of the School's policies and operations. The function of providing a home for boys was formally dropped and the focus turned to academics. Special education for students with learning disabilities was introduced, and State-certified special-education teachers and a psychologist were hired to meet students’ needs and educate faculty about working with learning disabilities. More emphasis was placed on tuition to balance the operating budget. The School admitted young women in 1981; in 1982, the Middle School program was formalized.

Notable alumni
 Michael Carter-Williams (born 1991), basketball player, last played for the Orlando Magic of the National Basketball Association (NBA)
 Bonzie Colson (born 1996), basketball player for Maccabi Tel Aviv of the Israeli Basketball Premier League 
 Ricky Ledo, Turkish League basketball player for Yeşilgiresun Belediye
 Demetris Nichols, former Knicks basketball player
 Andrew Robinson, actor, known for playing the Cardassian spy Elim Garak on Star Trek: Deep Space Nine
 Rakim Sanders, basketball player for Hapoel Gilboa Galil in Israel
 Cole Swider (born 1999), basketball player for the Los Angeles Lakers of the NBA

References

Educational institutions established in 1893
Boarding schools in Rhode Island
Buildings and structures in Barrington, Rhode Island
Schools in Bristol County, Rhode Island
Private middle schools in Rhode Island
Private elementary schools in Rhode Island
1893 establishments in Rhode Island